The Parima River is a river of Roraima state in northern Brazil. According to explorer and scientist Charles-Marie de La Condamine, the river received its name because it was once believed to flow into the mythical Lake Parime.

See also
List of rivers of Roraima

References

Rivers of Roraima